Worry Bomb is an album by Carter the Unstoppable Sex Machine, released in 1995. It reached #9 in the UK charts. It included a limited edition CD of the live show Doma Sportova...Live At Zagreb, recorded on 20 May 1994.

It was the first Carter USM album to feature new drummer Wez. Formerly of the band International Resque, he replaced the trusty drum machine which was the mainstay of their previous recordings.

As a result of this, the album marked a shift away from the characteristic sound of their previous records, and instead saw the group veer from full-on punk rock (Airplane Food/Airplane Fast Food), to more experimental sounds (the title track), and more downtempo ballads (Ceasefire).

Critical reception
Alternative Rock wrote that "Worry Bomb explodes in all directions at once, a breathless bonanza of true punk."

Track listing
 "Cheap 'n' Cheesy"
 "Airplane Food/Airplane Fast Food" 
 "Young Offender's Mum" 
 "Gas (Man)" 
 "Life And Soul Of Party Dies" 
 "My Defeatist Attitude" 
 "Worry Bomb" 
 "Senile Delinquent" 
 "Me And Mr Jones" 
 "Let's Get Tattoos" 
 "Going Straight" 
 "God Saint Peter And The Guardian Angel" 
 "Only Looney Left In Town" 
 "Ceasefire"

Doma Sportova...Live At Zagreb track listing
  "Alternative Alf Garnett" 
  "Do Re Me So Far So Good" 
  "Bachelor For Baden Powell" 
  "Re Educating Rita" 
  "Only Living Boy In New Cross" 
  "Lean On Me I Won't Fall Over" 
  "Granny Farming In The UK" 
  "Travis" 
  "Sing Fat Lady Sing" 
  "Lenny And Terence" 
  "Commercial Fucking Suicide"

Personnel
 Jim "Jim Bob" Morrison – vocals, guitar
 Les "Fruitbat" Carter – guitar, bass, vocals, keys, programming
 Wez – drums
 Sex Machine – producer
 Simon Painter – producer
 Steve 'Barney' Chase – engineer
 Mark Hayley – assistant engineer
 Paul Walton – assistant engineer
 Dave Garnish – assistant engineer
 Kevin Metcalf – mastering (at the Townhouse)

References

External links
 Carter USM

1995 albums
Carter the Unstoppable Sex Machine albums
Chrysalis Records albums